The Old Stone Arch is a stone arch bridge along the former route of the National Road in Marshall, Illinois. The U.S. Army Corps of Engineers built the bridge between 1828 and 1837, the period in which the Corps rebuilt much of the National Road. The National Road, the most-traveled U.S. road in the early 1800s and the first built by the U.S. government, connected Illinois to the Eastern United States and helped bring settlers and goods to the state during its early years. The bridge has served road traffic continuously since its construction and was part of U.S. Route 40 from the route's creation to 1953.

The bridge was added to the National Register of Historic Places on February 20, 1975.

See also
Old Stone Arch Bridge (Clark Center, Illinois), also on the National Road, also NRHP-listed
 
 
 
 
 List of bridges on the National Register of Historic Places in Illinois
 National Register of Historic Places listings in Clark County, Illinois

References

Road bridges on the National Register of Historic Places in Illinois
Buildings and structures in Clark County, Illinois
National Road
U.S. Route 40
National Register of Historic Places in Clark County, Illinois
Stone arch bridges in the United States